Yeferson Julio Soteldo Martínez (born 30 June 1997) is a Venezuelan professional footballer who plays for Brazilian club Santos and the Venezuela national team. Mainly a left winger, he can also play as an attacking midfielder.

Club career

Zamora
Soteldo was born in Acarigua, in the Venezuelan state of Portuguesa, and as a teen moved to Caracas.  After a difficult time in Caracas, his early coach in Caracas FC invited him to join Zamora FC at just 16 years old. On 16 September 2013, he made his first team debut (also his Primera División debut), coming on as a late substitute for Jhon Murillo in a 0–0 home draw against Atlético Venezuela.

Soteldo became a regular starter for Zamora from the 2014–15 season onwards, and scored his first professional goal on 28 January 2015, netting the opener in a 4–2 home win against Carabobo FC. On 20 May 2015, he scored a brace in a 3–2 home defeat of Mineros de Guayana. In the 2015 campaign, he played a key role by scoring twelve goals as his side lifted the Primera División trophy.

Huachipato
On 20 December 2016, Soteldo joined Chilean Primera División side Huachipato for a fee of € 1.5 million. He made his debut abroad on 17 February, replacing Leonardo Povea in a 2–1 home success over Universidad de Chile.

Soteldo scored his first goal abroad on 22 July 2017, netting his team's third in a 4–0 home routing of Deportes Valdivia, for the year's Copa Chile.

Universidad de Chile (loan)

On 11 January 2018, Soteldo joined fellow top tier side Universidad de Chile on a one-year loan deal. La U paid US$ 1.5 million fee for the loan, with a buyout clause of 50% of his rights set on US$3.5 million. A regular starter, he contributed with 26 league appearances and five goals.

Santos
On 12 January 2019, Soteldo agreed to a four-year contract with Série A side Santos FC. He made his debut for the club twelve days later, replacing Felippe Cardoso and scoring his team's third in a 4–0 away routing of São Bento, for the year's Campeonato Paulista.

Soteldo soon became an undisputed starter under Jorge Sampaoli, scoring two braces in the month of November, against Botafogo (4–1 home win) and Goiás (3–0 away win). On 11 February 2020, he renewed his contract until December 2023.

Toronto FC
On 24 April 2021, Soteldo's club Santos FC confirmed that Soteldo had been sold to MLS side Toronto FC for a fee of $6.5 million. The fee covers 75% of his playing rights and enables Santos FC to avoid a transfer ban imposed by FIFA due to them failing to pay Huachipato back in 2019. He made his debut on May 8, in a substitute appearance, against the New York Red Bulls. On July 7, Soteldo scored his first goal for Toronto against the New England Revolution.

Tigres
On 31 January 2022, Soteldo joined Liga MX club Tigres UANL in a transfer with Carlos Salcedo coming to Toronto in exchange.

Return to Santos (loan)
On 11 August 2022, Santos announced the return of Soteldo on loan until July 2023, with a buyout clause.

International career
On 19 January 2016, Soteldo was called up by Venezuela national team manager Noel Sanvicente for a friendly against Costa Rica. He made his full international debut on 2 February, playing the full 90 minutes in the 1–0 win in Barinas.

Soteldo was initially out of Rafael Dudamel's final 23-man list for the 2019 Copa América, but was called up on 8 June to replace injured Adalberto Peñaranda.

Style of play
Standing at 5 feet 2 inches tall, Soteldo is a diminutive and energetic forward, who is known for his flair and pace on the ball, as well as his playmaking ability and dribbling skills; although primarily a left winger, he is also capable of playing as an attacking midfielder. Upon signing for Toronto FC in 2021, Neil Davidson of The Globe and Mail described Soteldo as a "dangerous winger who likes to take on defenders and befuddle them with his moves, Soteldo can make goals and score them." Toronto GM Ali Curtis also described him with the following words: "He’s a really shifty player. Elusive. Good in tight spaces."

Career statistics

Club

International

Scores and results list Venezuela's goal tally first, score column indicates score after each Soteldo goal.

Honours

Club
Zamora
Venezuelan Primera División: 2013–14, 2015, 2016

Santos
Copa Libertadores runner-up: 2020

International
Venezuela U20
FIFA U-20 World Cup: runner-up 2017
South American Youth Football Championship: third place 2017

Individual
Venezuelan Primera División Team of the Year: Best Attacking Midfielder 2016
Chilean Primera División Best Foreign Player in Chile: 2017
Chilean Primera División Team of the Year: Best Left Midfielder 2017
Chilean Primera División Team of the Year: Best Left Midfielder 2018
Campeonato Paulista Team of the Year: 2020
Copa Libertadores Best XI: 2020

References

External links

 
 

1997 births
Living people
People from Acarigua
Venezuelan footballers
Association football midfielders
Association football wingers
Venezuelan Primera División players
Zamora FC players
Chilean Primera División players
C.D. Huachipato footballers
Universidad de Chile footballers
Campeonato Brasileiro Série A players
Santos FC players
Venezuela international footballers
Venezuelan expatriate footballers
Venezuelan expatriate sportspeople in Chile
Venezuelan expatriate sportspeople in Brazil
Expatriate footballers in Chile
Expatriate footballers in Brazil
2019 Copa América players
2021 Copa América players
Toronto FC players
Designated Players (MLS)
Venezuelan expatriate sportspeople in the United States
Expatriate soccer players in the United States
Major League Soccer players